North Java is a hamlet in Wyoming County, New York, United States. North Java has a post office with ZIP code 14113, which opened on July 29, 1845.

References

Hamlets in Wyoming County, New York
Hamlets in New York (state)